Bartłomiej Drągowski (born 19 August 1997) is a Polish professional footballer who plays as a goalkeeper for Serie A club Spezia and the Poland national team. He began his career with Polish side Jagiellonia Białystok where he made over 60 appearances before joining Fiorentina in 2016.

Personal life
Born in Bialystok, Poland, Drągowski is the son of former footballer Dariusz Drągowski, who played for Jagiellonia Białystok and Siarka Tarnobrzeg during his career.

Club career

Jagiellonia Białystok
An academy graduate of the former club himself, Drągowski made his Ekstraklasa debut at the age of 16 in a 4–4 draw with Korona Kielce on 27 May 2014. In August, he was given the opportunity to stand in goal for Jagiellonia as a substitute following the dismissal of Jakub Słowik in a match against Śląsk Wrocław. Following his performance during the match, Drągowski retained the number one jersey and at the season, his first full campaign in professional football, he was named the division's Best Goalkeeper, Discovery of the Season and voted third-best player overall. He ultimately made 69 appearances for the club across all competitions, including in which were appearances in the league, Polish Cup and UEFA Europa League.

Fiorentina
On 4 July 2016, he signed a five-year contract with Serie A side Fiorentina. He endured a difficult first season at the club, finding himself as third-choice goalkeeper behind Ciprian Tătărușanu and Luca Lezzerini, and later Marco Sportiello, before picking up a knee injury which ruled him out for several months. His debut, and only league appearance for the season, came on the final day of the campaign when he started in a 2–2 draw with Pescara.

Loan to Empoli
On 22 January 2019, Drągowski joined to Empoli on loan until 30 June 2019. He made the headlines after keeping a clean sheet and having made 17 saves in the Serie A match against Atalanta on 15 April, a new league record. In total, he faced 47 shots, of which 18 were on target.

Spezia

On 10 August 2022, Drągowski joined Serie A club Spezia on a three-year deal.

International career

Youth teams
Drągowski has represented Poland at various youth levels since his debut for the U17 side in 2014. In June 2017, he was one of 23 players named in the U21 squad by Marcin Dorna for the 2017 UEFA European Under-21 Championship, for which Poland were the hosts.

Senior team
In October 2020 he had called up to the national team for 2020–21 UEFA Nations League and friendly matches against Finland, Netherlands and Bosnia and Herzegovina.

He made his national team debut on 7 October 2020 in a friendly against Finland.

Career statistics

Club

International

Honours
Individual
 Ekstraklasa Goalkeeper of the Season: 2014–15
 Ekstraklasa Discovery of the Season: 2014–15

References

1997 births
Living people
Sportspeople from Białystok
Polish footballers
Poland youth international footballers
Poland under-21 international footballers
Poland international footballers
Association football goalkeepers
Jagiellonia Białystok players
ACF Fiorentina players
Empoli F.C. players
Spezia Calcio players
Ekstraklasa players
Serie A players
Expatriate footballers in Italy
Polish expatriate footballers
Polish expatriate sportspeople in Italy